Serkan Günes (Serkan Güneş, born 16 March 1980, in Istanbul, Turkey) is a Swedish–Turkish photographer best known for his landscape photographs of nature.

Günes was born in Istanbul, Turkey and later emigrated to Sweden at the age of 20. He now lives in Swedish Lapland.

According to Maria Ågren, Director General at Swedish Environmental Protection Agency, Günes "possesses a masters ability to capture the beauty in everyday landscapes, as well as the obvious beauty in the exotic landscapes". 
Günes works mainly in Scandinavia but also in many different parts of the world including the Arctic, Europe, Africa and Asia. His photographs are published in photo magazines in Europe and Asia.

Serkan Günes is a member of The Association of Swedish Professional Photographers.

Photographic and artistic philosophy
Günes' approach to nature photography combines elements of documentary photography and, mainly, art photography. Serkan Günes early influences was traditional landscape photographers, such as Ansel Adams and Eliot Porter. Nowadays he lists all "good pictures" as inspirational, as he says.

Bibliography
 Stockholm – Sjön, Skogen & Skärgården (2010), Balkong Förlag, 
 I huvudet på fotografen Serkan (2013), DEXT Förlag, 
 The Land of Eight Seasons (2017),

Awards
2006 – Wildlife Photographer of the Year, Eric Hosking Award, by the Natural History Museum in London and BBC Wildlife Magazine
2010 – Nature Photographer of the Year 2009, by Swedish Environmental Protection Agency

Exhibitions
 2019 - "The light of Lapland from above", Fujikina, Tokyo, Japan
 2017 - "The Land of Eight Seasons", Naturum Laponia Visitor Center, Stora Sjöfallet
 2016 - "The Land of Eight Seasons", Photokina photo fair, Germany
 2016 - "Mitt Tyresta", Tyresta National Park Information Centre, Stockholm
 2015 - "Årstider", Wilderness fair, Stockholm
 2014 - "Vildmark", Wilderness fair, Stockholm
 2013 – “Bruno Liljefors och naturfotograferna", Waldermarsudde, Stockholm
 2012 – “Ljus, ljus och åter ljus”, Bollmoradalens kyrka, Church of Sweden, Stockholm
 2011 – “Chasing the Light”, The Swedish Museum of Natural History, Stockholm
 2008 – “Mitt Afrika”, Photo fair, Stockholm
 2008 – “Nordiskt ljus”, Wilderness fair, Stockholm
 2006 – “Wildlife Photographer of the Year”, Natural History Museum, London

References

1980 births
Living people
Swedish people of Turkish descent
Nature photographers
Swedish photographers
Landscape photographers
Turkish photographers